Iglesia de San Juan el Real (Llamas) is a church in Asturias, Spain. It was established in 857.

See also
Asturian art
Catholic Church in Spain
Churches in Asturias
List of oldest church buildings

References

Churches in Asturias
9th-century churches in Spain
Bien de Interés Cultural landmarks in Asturias
Religious buildings and structures completed in 857